The Sidney A. Murray Jr. Hydroelectric Station, also known as Louisiana Hydroelectric (LA Hydro), opened in response to a need for a non-polluting, less-costly power source for Vidalia, Louisiana. A site approximately 40 miles south of the town was selected for the new facility. The 192 MW plant started full-scale operations in 1990. It was designed to rely on the Mississippi River's natural flow and elevation drop at the Old River Control Structure, therefore not needing a large impound dam. It was also built in accordance with the U.S. Army Corps of Engineers existing water management objective with minimal impacts on the surrounding environment. The station operates more continuously than most run-of-the-river hydro plants, with a capacity factor of approximately 55% and an estimated availability in excess of 99%.

It is currently under an approved 42-year power purchase contract with Louisiana Power & Light (a subsidiary of Entergy). The city of Vidalia purchases 6% of the power with an option to purchase up to 15% of the generated power.

The LA Hydro is the largest prefabricated power plant in the world. Its main business office is located in Vidalia.

Notes 

Energy infrastructure completed in 1990
Buildings and structures in Concordia Parish, Louisiana
Hydroelectric power plants in Louisiana
Entergy